Sir John Walsham, 2nd Baronet  (29 October 1830 – 10 December 1905) was a British diplomat who was envoy to China and Romania.

Career
Walsham was the eldest son of Sir John James Walsham, 1st Baronet. He was educated at Bury St Edmunds Grammar School and Trinity College, Cambridge. He joined the Audit Office in March 1854 but transferred to the Foreign Office that October. He served in Mexico 1857–65, including acting as chargé d'affaires 1863–65. He served in Madrid 1866–70 at a time when the Spanish forts on the Strait of Gibraltar would fire on passing merchant ships if they failed to display their national flags. Walsham was a commissioner dealing with the arbitration of claims under an agreement of 1865, such as that of the schooner Mermaid, of Dartmouth, alleged to have been sunk by the fort at Ceuta. In 1870 Walsham moved to The Hague, and in 1873 he was nominated as secretary of legation at Peking but did not go there; instead he withdrew from the service because of the illness of his father, who died on 10 August 1874. Walsham, having succeeded to the baronetcy, rejoined the service in January 1875 and was posted back to Madrid, then in 1878 to Berlin, and in 1883 to Paris where he was given the rank of Minister Plenipotentiary in the absence of the Ambassador. In 1885 he was appointed Envoy Extraordinary and Minister Plenipotentiary to the Emperor of China and the King of Korea. After seven years his health deteriorated due to the heavy work and the climate, and he returned to Europe and was envoy to Romania 1892–94. He retired in 1894 and was knighted KCMG in February 1895.

References

External links
Walsham, Sir John (1830-1905) 2nd Baronet Diplomat, UK National Archives

1830 births
1905 deaths
People educated at King Edward VI School, Bury St Edmunds
Alumni of Trinity College, Cambridge
Baronets in the Baronetage of the United Kingdom
Ambassadors of the United Kingdom to China
Ambassadors of the United Kingdom to Korea
Ambassadors of the United Kingdom to Romania
Knights Commander of the Order of St Michael and St George